Jamal Mahjoub (born London 1966) is a mixed-race writer of British and Sudanese parents. He writes in English and has published eight novels under his own name. In 2012, Mahjoub began writing a series of crime fiction novels under the pseudonym Parker Bilal.

Published work

Writing in The Observer, Zoë Heller described Mahjoub's first novel, Navigation of a Rainmaker (1989), as providing "a rich picture, both of Africa's vast, seemingly insuperable problems – and of the moral dilemmas faced by a well-meaning, ineffectual stranger". Wings of Dust (1994), Mahjoub's second novel, explores the legacy of the first generation of Northern Sudanese who were educated in the West in the 1950s and inherited the task of creating the newly independent nation. In the Hour of Signs (1996) recounts the story of the Mahdi, who led a revolt in 19th-century Turko-Egyptian Sudan, expelling the Khedive Ismail's troops. According to the TLS, the novel conveys "A profound awareness that man refuses to learn from history, because he is blind to the guises in which it repeats itself." In the process General Gordon was killed, which led to the British Reconquest and the formation of the Anglo-Egyptian Sudan in 1898.

"Mahjoub's first three novels can be loosely read as a trilogy of political events in Sudan. Emulating the turmoil and uncertaintly of the Sudan, his writing distinguishes itself by its dynamism"

The Carrier (1998) is split between the early 17th century and present-day Denmark, where an archaeological find reveals a link to a visitor from the Arab world in medieval times. The novel's astronomical theme touches on the discovery of Heliocentricity and the work of Danish astronomer Tycho Brahe. Travelling with Djinns (2003) tells the story of Yasin, a man with a similar background to the author, who absconds with his young son Leo and travels through Europe in a Peugeot 504. In The Drift Latitudes (2006), Rachel, following the death of her son, becomes aware of the existence of a half-sister, Jade; the product of a relationship her father had late in life. The novel depicts life around a jazz club in Liverpool frequented by African sailors in the 1960s. Nubian Indigo (2006) addresses the author's Nubian heritage on his father's side. The novel uses a mixture of fable and multiple characters to describe events around the evacuation of Nubian villages as a consequence of the raising of the Aswan High Dam. The novel was first published in French in 2006.

Critical reception and awards
Mahjoub's work has been broadly acclaimed and translated into several European languages. In 1993, "The Cartographer’s Angel" won a one-off short story prize organised by The Guardian newspaper in conjunction with the publisher Heinemann Books, judged by Adewale Maja-Pearce, Margaret Busby and Ian Mayes. In the 2000s, his work received much attention in Europe: In 2001 in Italy, Mahjoub was a finalist for the La cultura del mare prize started by Alberto Moravia. In 2004 in France, The Carrier (French: Le Télescope de Rachid) won the Prix de L’Astrolabe, an award given annually at the Etonnants Voyageurs festival in St Malo. In 2005, "The Obituary Tango" was shortlisted for the Caine Prize, and in 2006, a short story, "Carrer Princesa", won the NH Hotels Mario Vargas Llosa prize for short stories.

Parker Bilal
In 2012, Mahjoub began publishing crime fiction under the pseudonym "Parker Bilal". The Golden Scales (2012) was the first of a six novel series set in Cairo featuring the exiled Sudanese detective Makana. Mahjoub subsequently began a UK-set series of crime novels featuring detective Drake and forensic psychologist Crane, the first entry of which was The Divinities (2019).

Bibliography

As Jamal Mahjoub 
 Navigation of a Rainmaker (1989)
 Wings of Dust (1994)
 In the Hour of Signs (1996)
 The Carrier (1998)
 Travelling With Djinns (2003)
 The Drift Latitudes (2006)
 Nubian Indigo (2006)
 A Line in the River: Khartoum, City of Memory (2018)
 The Fugitives (Canongate Books, 2021)

As Parker Bilal 
 The Golden Scales (Bloomsbury, 2012)
 Dogstar Rising (Bloomsbury, 2013)
 The Ghost Runner (Bloomsbury, 2014)
 The Burning Gates (Bloomsbury, 2015)
 City of Jackals (Bloomsbury, 2016)
 Dark Water (Bloomsbury, 2017)
 The Divinities (The Indigo Press, 2019)
 The Heights (Severn House Publishers, 2020)
 The Trenches (Canongate Books, 2022)

See also 

 Sudanese literature
 History of Sudan

References

External links
Author's website
"Story behind The Ghost Runner" - Online Essay by Parker Bilal.

1966 births
Living people
People from Khartoum
British writers
People educated at Atlantic College